"But What a Sweet Little Room" is the thirteenth episode of the 1969 ITC British television series Randall and Hopkirk (Deceased) starring Mike Pratt, Kenneth Cope and Annette Andre. The episode was first broadcast on 14 December 1969 on the ITV. Directed by Roy Ward Baker.

Synopsis
Jeff investigates the disappearance of a wealthy young woman's aunt. When she too is killed he is led to the regular meetings of a medium, Madame Hanska, and uses Jeannie as a decoy to foil a thieving operation in which a gang of three middle-class men murder and rob rich middle-aged widows by taking them on an apparently innocent excursion to a cottage in the county.

Overview
In this episode Marty contacts a phoney psychic medium who claims to be able to contact the dead husbands and wives of well-heeled middle-aged widows and widowers. To the fake medium's extreme surprise he is then able to materialise as a ghost in front of her (the first real ghost she has ever seen in her long career) and gets her to confess to receiving money from the gang of three middle-class men in return for setting up séances at which they target wealthy widows and lure them to their deaths. She shows a genuine sense of fear and remorse over her wrongdoing when confronted by Marty the ghost.

This is a particularly macabre episode (very different from the almost slapstick comedic atmosphere of The Ghost of Monte Carlo) with the sudden unexpected grisly death of the widow in an airtight room, initially masquerading as a delightful cottage drawing room or study (the room that gives its name to the episode title), shown in graphic detail at the start of the program.  Only later on in the episode does it become clear why such a bizarre and elaborate means of murdering the widows has been constructed by the scriptwriters when Jeff is also nearly gassed to death in the same room only to be saved at the last moment with Marty's usual spiritual assistance.

Cast
Mike Pratt as Jeff Randall
Kenneth Cope as Marty Hopkirk
Annette Andre as Jeannie Hopkirk
Frances Bennett ....  Anne Fenwick
Norman Bird ....  Elliot
Joby Blanshard ....  Police Inspector
Anne De Vigier ....  Julia Fenwick
Chris Gannon ....  Salesman
Michael Goodliffe ....  Arthur de Crecy
Doris Hare ....  Madame Hanska
Cyril Renison ....  Andrews
Betty Woolfe ....  Martha
Raymond Young ....  Rawlings

Production
Although the 13th episode in the series, But What a Sweet Little Room was actually the second episode to be shot, filmed in June–July 1968.

References

External links

Episode overview at Randallandhopkirk.org.uk
Filming locations at Randallandhopkirk.org.uk

Randall and Hopkirk (Deceased) episodes
1969 British television episodes